BOPE or Bope may refer to:

Military police units
Batalhão de Operações Policiais Especiais, the police tactical unit of the Military Police of Rio de Janeiro State, Brazil
Battalion of Special Operations (Portuguese: Batalhão de Operações Especiais), a unit of the military police of Paraná, Brazil
Special Operations Battalion (PMAC) (Portuguese: Batalhão de Operações Especiais), a special operations force of the military police of the State of Acre, Brazil

Other uses
 Bope Bokadi (born 1996), Congolese professional footballer
 SS H.P. Bope